Nathan Baggaley (born 6 December 1975 in Byron Bay, New South Wales) is an Australian sprint canoeist and surfski champion. He is a three-times world champion in the K-1 500 m events and has also won two Olympic silver medals. His career has been tarnished by drug scandals and arrests.

Career summary
He made his international debut for Australia in 1997, initially competing in the K-2. In 1999 he switched to the K-1 and reached the K-1 500 m semifinals at Sydney in 2000. He became one of the top stars in the sport, winning three consecutive K-1 500 m world championships (2002, 2003, 2005). At the Athens Olympics Baggaley won the silver medal in the K-1 500 m, edged out by Canadian Adam van Koeverden. In the K-2 race he partnered with Clint Robinson to another silver medal. He was voted the Australian Institute of Sport’s Athlete of the Year in 2004. Baggeley returned to win in the K-1 500 m event at Zagreb in 2005 prior to being banned for 24 months for steroid use.

Steroids and illicit drug
In September 2005 Baggaley tested positive for banned steroids (stanozolol and methandienone). Baggaley was subsequently banned for 15 months by Australian Canoeing. The suspension was extended to two years by the International Canoe Federation, with authorities saying they did not consider drinking his brother's steroid-laced orange juice to be an extenuating circumstance. Baggaley said that he had been drug-tested at least fifty times in his career and had always tested negative. At the time Baggaley announced he wanted to return to kayaking after serving his suspension, with the comment that after 10 years of competition "I could seriously do with the rest." However the Australian Canoe Federation rejected a reinstatement application from Baggaley in October 2007 after his arrest with hundreds of ecstasy tablets earlier that same year.

In February 2007 police had stopped Baggaley and a companion in Mermaid Waters, Gold Coast, Queensland and on searching their car they found 762 ecstasy tablets, cannabis and cash. Baggaley was arrested again in November 2007 and jailed, facing more drug charges of manufacture and dealing ectasy. In February 2009, Baggaley pleaded guilty to manufacturing 1,509 tablets of the drug MDMA and to two counts of supplying a prohibited drug, and was due to be sentenced in March. His younger brother Dru, arrested with Nathan, pleaded guilty to manufacturing 13,500 tablets of MDMA and one count of supply. He was sentenced to nine years in jail with a non-parole period of 5 years.

Additionally in July 2007, Nathan Baggaley was arrested after allegedly stealing a surf ski from the Byron Bay Surf Club. He pleaded guilty to theft and was placed on a six-month good behaviour bond and ordered to pay $70 court costs.

In June 2010 Baggaley was charged with possession of a prescribed restricted substance, being steroids, in jail at the Cessnock Correctional Centre. He was subsequently moved to the Metropolitan Remand and Reception Centre. On 20 November 2011, Baggaley was released from the Grafton Correctional Centre, having served his custodial sentence.

In November 2013, Baggaley was arrested by Australian Federal Police and charged with various counts of conspiracy to import a commercial quantity of a border-controlled drug into Australia, conspiracy to manufacture and produce a prohibited drug (2C-B a psychedelic drug), the manufacture and production of a prohibited drug and one count of supplying a large commercial quantity of a prohibited drug. He was remanded in custody and officially refused bail. In February 2015 Baggaley pleaded guilty to "drug manufacturing and conspiracy charges". In December he was sentenced by Judge Leonie Flannery to a non-parole period of two years and three months.

On 20 June 2019, Nathan Baggaley was arrested at his home in Byron Bay in connection with the same alleged crime, after "an ongoing investigation and evidence collection over the past 11 months." After pleading not guilty, on 1 April 2021 Baggaley and his brother were found guilty. Baggaley was sentenced to 25 years on July 27 2021.

References

Wallechinsky, David and Jaime Loucky (2008). "Canoeing: Men's Kayak Singles 500 Meters". In The Complete Book of the Olympics: 2008 Edition. London: Aurum Press Limited. pp. 470–1.

1975 births
Australian Institute of Sport canoeists
Australian male canoeists
Australian sportspeople in doping cases
Canoeists at the 2000 Summer Olympics
Canoeists at the 2004 Summer Olympics
Doping cases in canoeing
Living people
Olympic canoeists of Australia
Olympic silver medalists for Australia
Sportsmen from New South Wales
Olympic medalists in canoeing
Doping cases in Australian canoeing
ICF Canoe Sprint World Championships medalists in kayak
Medalists at the 2004 Summer Olympics
Australian drug traffickers
21st-century Australian people